Purna Chandra Jamatia is an Indian social political activist and elected Chief Executive Member of the Tripura Tribal Areas Autonomous District Council (TTAADC) for the first time. Purna Chandra Jamatia was elected from the Killa Bagma Assembly constituency.

Career 
Purna Chandra Jamatia has a degree in political science and had spent a significant amount of time working with the ruling coalition's affiliate, the Indigenous People's Front of Tripura (IPFT), before joining The Indigenous Progressive Regional Alliance (TIPRA).

In August, 2021, a delegation lead by Tripura Royal Head Pradyot Manikya and CEM of TTAADC, Purna Chandra Jamatia meet Brazilian Ambassadors

In April 2021, he was elected as Chief Executive Member of the Tripura Tribal Areas Autonomous District Council.

Activities 
 
In August, 2021, a delegation lead by Tripura Royal Head Pradyot Manikya and CEM of TTAADC, Purna Chandra Jamatia meet Brazilian Ambassadors

References 

Tripura politicians
Living people
Year of birth missing (living people)